Lachanodes arborea, the she cabbage tree, is a small tree in the family Asteraceae. It is an endangered endemic of the island of Saint Helena in the South Atlantic Ocean. It is now extinct in the wild.

See also
Flora of St Helena
He cabbage tree

References

Other sources
 Cronk, Q.C.B. (1995) The endemic Flora of St Helena. Anthony Nelson Ltd., Oswestry.

External links

Senecioneae
Flora of Saint Helena
Critically endangered plants